Glide is a molecular modeling software for docking of small molecules into proteins and other biopolymers. It was developed by Schrödinger, Inc.

References

Further reading 

 
 

Molecular modelling software
Computational chemistry software